Westhorpe is a linear village and civil parish in the Mid Suffolk district of Suffolk, England.

Westhorpe Hall was a former seat of the Dukes of Suffolk, and was where Mary Tudor, Queen of France died. East Thorpe manor, its close neighbour, was the seat of a previous duke, William de la Pole, 1st Duke of Suffolk.

John Clarke (1609–1676), physician, Baptist minister, co-founder of the Colony of Rhode Island and Providence Plantations and author of its charter, was born in Westhorpe. Jean Kent (1921−2013), film and television actress, lived at Westhorpe until her death

References

External links 

Westhorpe, Suffolk, Genuki

 
Villages in Suffolk
Civil parishes in Suffolk
Mid Suffolk District